Modhumoti Bank Limited is a private limited commercial bank in Bangladesh. The bank was established in 2013. Md Shafiul Azam is the Chief Executive Officer of the Bank. Humayun Kabir is the chairperson and Sheikh Salahuddin Jewel is the Vice Chairman of the Bank. Sheikh Fazle Noor Taposh is a director of the Bank.

History 
Modhumoti Bank Limited was established on 19 September 2013. Md Shafiul Azam was appointed managing director of the bank in August 2016.

In 2018, Modhumoti announced plans to focus on becoming a bank for Small Middle Enterprise in rural areas.

In August 2019, Md Shafiul Azam was re-appointed managing director of Modhumoti Bank Limited. From 2018 to 2019, non performing loans at the bank increased by 555 per cent to 580 million taka.

Former Mayor of Dhaka South City Corporation, Sayeed Khokon, accused the incumbent mayor of North Dhaka and Modhumoti Bank Limited director, Sheikh Fazle Noor Taposh, of hording illegal wealth at the Bank in January 2021. Khokon was sued for defamation by lawyers aligned with Taposh. In June 2021, The Credit Rating Agency of Bangladesh rated the bank as A1 category. Manwar Hossain, son of Anwar Hossain and chairman of Anwar Group of Industries in a director of the Bank.

Board of Directors

References

External links
 

Banks established in 1995
Banks of Bangladesh
Companies listed on the Dhaka Stock Exchange
Companies based in Dhaka